The seventh season of Bulgarian reality singing competition The Voice of Bulgaria premiered on February 23, 2020, and broadcast at 20:00 every Sunday until June 14, 2020, on bTV. Kamelia, Grafa Ampov, Ivan Lechev returned for their fourth season as coaches on the show while Mihaela Fileva returned for her second season.

Georgi Shopov from team Lechev was crowned as the Voice of Bulgaria. This is the third win of Ivan Lechev on the show.

Coaches 

Kamelia, Grafa,  Ivan Lechev, and Mihaela Fileva are the returning coaches from the previous season.

Teams 

 Color key

Blind Auditions ( Castings in the Dark ) 
For this season, the "Block Button" returned with a slight change. When the coach gets block by another coach, the chair of blocked coach won't turn. Each coach will receive also only one block for the entire blind auditions.

Color Key

Episode 1 ( February 23, 2020 )

Episode 2 ( March 1, 2020 )

Episode 3 ( March 8, 2020 )

Episode 4 ( March 15, 2020 )

Episode 5 ( March 22, 2020 )

Episode 6 ( March 29, 2020 )

Episode 7 ( April 5, 2020 )

The Battles ( Vocal Fight ) 
The Battles began on April 12, 2020. Back from past seasons, each coaches are given two "Steals" to save losing contestant in their respective battle from other team.

Notes 

  Grafa conducted a three-way battle which is the first time in the Bulgarian version of the franchise.

Knockouts 
The Knockout Round take place on May 10, 2020. Every team is composed of six contestant from their team and two contestants whom stolen from other team for the total of  eight contestants. Addition to this season, "Spectator Theft" was added. A power given to audience and televiewers to save one losing contestant in the Knockout rounds via online voting.

Color key

Live Concerts 
For this season, live concerts is reduced to two episodes from typically three or four shows. Live showdowns was removed in this season thus making only live shows divided to two ,  which is the semi-finals and the Finals. Also, Live concerts are filmed without audiences due to COVID-19 Pandemic.

Color key:

Week 1: Semifinal (June 7, 2020)

Episode 16

Week 2: Finals  (June 14, 2020)

Episode 17: first round

Second round: final results

Elimination Chart

Overall 

 Color key
 Artist's info

 Result details

References 

2020 television seasons
2020 in Bulgaria
Bulgaria
Bulgarian television series
Bulgarian-language television shows